Alan-Michael Cash (born August 20, 1987) is a former Canadian football defensive tackle of the Canadian Football League (CFL). He played college football at North Carolina State University and attended Varina High School in Richmond, Virginia. Cash has also been a member of the Richmond Revolution of the Indoor Football League (IFL) and the Montreal Alouettes of the CFL.

Professional career

Richmond Revolution
Cash played for the Richmond Revolution of the IFL in 2010.

Montreal Alouettes
Cash was signed by the Montreal Alouettes of the CFL on May 26, 2011. He was released on June 5, 2011.

Cash re-signed with the Alouettes on February 21, 2012. He signed an extension with the team on December 19, 2013. He was named a CFL East Division All-Star in 2014.

Toronto Argonauts
Cash signed with the Toronto Argonauts on March 23, 2017.

References

External links
Montreal Alouettes profile 
College stats

1987 births
Living people
African-American players of American football
African-American players of Canadian football
American football defensive tackles
Canadian football defensive linemen
Montreal Alouettes players
Toronto Argonauts players
NC State Wolfpack football players
Players of American football from Virginia
Richmond Revolution players
Sportspeople from Richmond, Virginia
Edmonton Elks players
Players of Canadian football from Virginia